The House at 5–7 Winter Street in Arlington, Massachusetts is a rare late-19th century two family house in East Arlington.  The wood-frame house was built in 1895 by John Squires, who owned a garden farm.  It was built as a speculative venture at a time before Arlington's market gardeners began selling their land off for development.  The building exhibits well-preserved Queen Anne styling, with asymmetric massing characteristic of that style, and a judicious use of decorative cut wood shingles.

The house was listed on the National Register of Historic Places in 1985.

See also
National Register of Historic Places listings in Arlington, Massachusetts

References

Houses on the National Register of Historic Places in Arlington, Massachusetts
Houses in Arlington, Massachusetts